The Grêmio Recreativo Escola de Samba Beija-Flor is a Samba school headquartered in the municipality of Nilópolis, Baixada Fluminense, in the state of Rio de Janeiro, Brazil.

In total, Beija-Flor has won 14 parades of the Carnaval do Rio de Janeiro; as general champion in 1976, 1977, 1978, 1980, 1983, 1998, 2003, 2004, 2005, 2007, 2008, 2011, 2015 and 2018. It was the overall runner-up and vice champion school in 1979, 1981, 1985, 1986, 1989, 1990, 1999, 2000, 2001, and 2002. With the departure of Joãosinho Trinta after the Carnaval of 1992, the school featured Maria Augusta and the young Milton Cunha as carnival producers. Only with the creation of the Carnaval Commission in 1998, could the school return to win championships. Nowadays, Beija-flor's Carnaval Commission.

History 
The Beija-Flor Samba School was formed on December 25, 1948, by a carnivalesque blocos of Nilópolis.  The name was inspired by the ranch Beija-Flor that existed in the city of Marquês de Valença. The idea emerged from a group formed by Milton de Oliveira (Negão da Cuíca), Edson Vieira Rodrigues (Edinho do Ferro Velho), Helles Ferreira da Silva, Mário Silva, Walter da Silva, Hamilton Floriano, and José Fernandes da Silva. But it was the mother of Negão da Cuíca, Dona Eulália, that suggested the name of the school. Because of that, she became admitted as the founder of the school. Only in 1953, the bloco, that became victorious in the neighborhood, was renamed G.R.E.S. Beija-Flor de Nilópolis. The school then first paraded officially in 1954 for the Second Group, where it obtained first place.

The history of the school, that has as its symbol the hummingbird (which in Portuguese is called Beija-flor), could be divided into two part; before and after Joãosinho Trinta. Joãosinho Trinta took on the school in 1976 with the samba-enredo (plot) in honor to the jogo do bicho (illegal type of gambling in Brazil). The parades signed by him became so anthological that even when he did not win he left a mark in the avenue. That is what happened in 1989 when the school, known by its luxurious rows and floats, surprised the public with the plot Ratos e urubus, larguem a minha fantasia ("Rats and vultures, release my costume") bringing to the Sambódromo cars and rows full of trash, beside the famous covered Cristo Redentor. It was on that year that Beija-Flor became vice-champion, but Joãosinho was considered by some people the righteous champion of the parade. .

During the 1990s, the school was always placed in the first places, being that in the period of 2003/05 it conquered its second trichampionship. In 2007 it won again, this time with a considerable difference of points from the second placed. Months after the Carnaval, the Brazilian Federal Police, during the Hurricane Operation, imprisoned, among others, the patron of the school, Anísio Abraão David, and also a large amount of money that, according to the official was responsible for the operation, would be used to buy judges for the parades and like that guarantee the victory of Beija-Flor. Later, a CPI (Parliamentary Commission of Inquiry) was installed in the City Council of city of Rio de Janeiro. It did not prove that the alleged kits were for only the voting maps and the police officer that affirmed such fraud refused to attend to testify in CPI.

For 2008, the Commission of Carnaval chose the theme "Macabapá: Equinócio Solar, viagem fantástica ao meio do mundo" and conquered its 11th title. after the carnival 2018, the school has lost one of its greatest mentors, Laíla who left the college, after not agreeing with the new model of carnival. The Members who have made the Commission remain in school now as helpers and now in opted for carnival dual Alexandre Louzada and Cid Carvalho, who were already from the Commission.

Classifications

References

External links 

 

Samba schools of Rio de Janeiro
Jogo do Bicho
1948 establishments in Brazil